Riku Sjöroos (born 10 March 1995) is a Finnish professional footballer who plays as a winger for IFK Mariehamn.

Career
Sjöroos signed with IFK Mariehamn for the 2019 season. He returned to IFK Mariehamn for the 2022 season on 19 January 2022.

References

External links
IFK Mariehamn profile

1995 births
Living people
Finnish footballers
Åbo IFK players
Turun Palloseura footballers
IFK Mariehamn players
Veikkausliiga players
Ykkönen players
Kakkonen players
Association football forwards